Șoimu or Șoimul may refer to the following places in Romania:
 Șoimu, a village in the commune Smârdioasa in Teleorman County
 Șoimul, a tributary of the Cracăul Negru in Neamț County
 Șoimul (Crișul Negru), a tributary of the Poclușa in Bihor County
 Șoimul (Iara), a tributary of the Iara in Cluj County
 Șoimul (Putna), a tributary of the Putna in Vrancea County

See also 
 Șoimuș (disambiguation)